Verendrye was a historic unincorporated community in McHenry County, North Dakota, United States, located approximately eight miles northwest of Karlsruhe and 13 miles northeast of Velva within Falsen Township. Although classified by the USGS as a populated place, it is considered a ghost town.

History

The community was first known as Falsen, founded in 1912 by Norwegian settlers, who named it for Norwegian statesman Christian Magnus Falsen. Falsen was also the name of the station on the Great Northern Railway. The post office was established with the name Falsen in 1913, but the name was changed in 1925 to honor Pierre de la Verendrye, an early French-Canadian explorer who was said to be the first non-Native American person to tour the North Dakota prairies. The population of Falsen in 1920 was 75. The population of Verendrye in 1938 was 100, but when the railroad switched to diesel locomotives, it no longer needed to make regular stops at Verendrye for water and coal. This was the beginning of Verendrye's final decline, with the post office closing in 1965, and the final residents moved away in 1970. A farmstead now occupies the townsite, and the last remnant of Verendrye, the crumbling remains of the Falsen School, sits in a corner of the property.

Along with Norwegians, Falsen was originally settled by German-Russians from the villages of Kandel and Selz in the Ukraine.

A monument to the later North West Company fur trader and explorer, David Thompson, erected by the Great Northern Railway in 1925, remains on a hilltop overlooking the former townsite.

The Verendrye Electric Cooperative was established here in 1939 but relocated to Velva in 1941.

Geography
Verendrye is located in the Mouse River Valley along the route of the BNSF Railway.

References

External links
Images of Verendrye from Flickr
1929 map showing Verendrye townsite with school and two churches

German-Russian culture in North Dakota
Ghost towns in North Dakota
Geography of McHenry County, North Dakota
Unincorporated communities in North Dakota
Norwegian-American culture in North Dakota
Populated places established in 1912
1912 establishments in North Dakota